A Pastor is the leader of a Christian congregation.

Pastor may also refer to:

People
Pastor (surname)
Pastor López (1944-2019), Venezuelan cumbia singer-songwriter
Pastor Troy (born 1977), American rapper and record producer
Pastor (footballer) (born 2000), David Samuel Custódio Lima, Brazilian footballer

Religion
Worship pastor, a person who ministers using contemporary worship or Christian music
Pastor aeternus, 1870 document defining Catholic doctrines
Pastor bonus, 1988 apostolic constitution

Animals
Pastor (bird), the genus for the bird known as the Rosy starling
Pastor Garafiano, Spanish sheep dog breed
Mpanjaka pastor, moth of the family Erebidae

Films
Pastor Hall, 1940 British drama film
Pastor Brown, 2009 American Christian drama film
The VelociPastor, 2017 American comedy horror film

Other uses
Al pastor, preparation of spit-grilled slices of pork in Mexican cuisine

See also
Pastores, town in Sacatepéquez, Guatemala